Jacarepaguá–Roberto Marinho Airport  is an airport in the neighborhood of Barra da Tijuca, Rio de Janeiro, Brazil dedicated to general aviation. Following extensive renovation in 2008 the airport was renamed after Roberto Pisani Marinho (1904–2003), a journalist and former president of Globo Network. It is a major helibase for offshore support.

During a transitional period, the airport is jointly operated by Infraero and XP Inc.

History
On November 14, 1927 the Compagnie Générale Aéropostale started its operations in Brazil flying between Natal and Buenos Aires, with multiple stops on the Brazilian coast, using aircraft with landing gear having as pilots Jean Mermoz, Antoine de Saint-Exupéry, and Henri Guillaumet among others. It was part of a larger project linking France and South America. The airline was based in Rio de Janeiro, from where flights departed north and southbound. In Rio de Janeiro it used not only the military airport Campo dos Afonsos but it also had its own alternative airport, called Latecoère Field. This private facility became later known as Jacarepaguá Airport. Even though Campo dos Afonsos had a better structure and easier access, the air approach was difficult and the weather was not always good. With the dissolution of Aéropostale in 1932 and the airport was forgotten.
 
In 1944, the airport became a base of the Brazilian Air Force and it was used for flight training. On September 19, 1966 it was decommissioned and it became an airfield for general aviation.

It was only in 1969 that the construction of a terminal, an apron and hangars began. On January 19, 1971 the new airport was officially opened.

The main user was Aeroclube do Brasil. It operated previously at Manguinhos Airport but with the closure of that facility in 1961 it spent years without being able to operate. In 1971 it moved its headquarters to Jacarepaguá Airport where hangars and administrative and social center were built and it was able to operate once again.

During the year 2007 Jacarepaguá Airport underwent major renovations as preparations for the 2007 Pan American Games. The runway was extended, the terminal was renovated, the control-tower got new equipment and the apron and runway got new lightning systems. Later, Infraero considered the airport in condition to handle the increase of traffic during the 2014 FIFA World Cup and the 2016 Summer Olympics.

Currently, most of the operations at the airport are by helicopter and aircraft operators offshore oilfields. In the past, however, TwoFlex operated regular flights to São Paulo–Congonhas Airport. Those flights operated between October 28, 2019 and March 13, 2020.

Previously operated by Infraero, on August 18, 2022 XP Inc. won a 30-year concession to operate the airport.

Airlines and destinations

Accidents and incidents
17 May 1975: a Douglas C-47B PP-CDD of Motortec Indústria Aeronáutica was reported to have been damaged beyond economic repair at Jacarepaguá Airport.

Access
The airport is located in the neighborhood of Barra da Tijuca  from downtown Rio de Janeiro.

See also

List of airports in Brazil

References

External links

Airports in Rio de Janeiro (city)
Airports in Rio de Janeiro (state)
Transport in Rio de Janeiro (city)
Airports established in 1927